Jimbour West is a rural locality in the Western Downs Region, Queensland, Australia. In the  Jimbour West had a population of 56 people.

Geography 
Jimbour West is bounded to the east by the Dalby–Jandowae Road.

The predominant land use is cropping.

Kuyura is a neighbourhood around the former Kuyuru railway station on the closed Jandowae railway line. There were two other stations on the line in Jimbour West: 

 Cresley railway station

 Marnhull railway station

History 
The locality takes its name from the town of Jimbour, which in turn takes its name from the pastoral run Jimbour Station, which was named in 1841 by pastoralist Henry Dennis using an Aboriginal word meaning either sheep or good grass.

In the  Jimbour West had a population of 56 people.

Economy 
There are a number of homesteads in the locality:

 Birriwa
 Bundarra
 Carmyle
 Coolibah
 Coondara
 Cresley
 Deloraine
 Driffield
 Kantara
 Kensington
 Kenyon Downs
 Lake Success
 Lynthorpe
 Macroom
 Mungula
 Newfed
 Obyland
 Quinden
 South Wyobie
 Tarana
 The Towers
 Walmer
 Walugra
 Warraway
 Wyobie

Education 
There are no schools in Jimbour West. The nearest primary schools are Jandowae State School in neighbouring Jandowae to the north, Jimbour State School in neighbouring Jimbour East to the south-east and Warra State School in neighbouring Warra to the south-west. Jandowae State School provides secondary education to Year 10. For secondary education to Year 12, the nearest schools are Dalby State High School in Dalby to the south-east and Chinchilla State High School in Chinchilla to the west .

References 

Western Downs Region
Localities in Queensland